The 2019–20 Latvian–Estonian Basketball League, known as Paf Latvian–Estonian Basketball League for sponsorship reasons, was the 2nd season of the Latvian–Estonian Basketball League, the combined top basketball division of Latvia and Estonia.

On 12 March 2020, the league was suspended until further notice due to the COVID-19 pandemic. Eventually, the league was not resumed and no champions were named.

Competition format 
The competition format follows the usual double round-robin format. During the course of the regular season, which lasts from 27 September 2019 to 22 March 2020, all the teams play each other twice, once at home and once away, for a total of 28 games. Teams are ranked by total points, with the eight highest-ranked teams advancing to the quarter-finals. Unlike the previous season, in  this season the quarterfinal series will be played to two wins. The winning teams will determine the champion in a Final Four tournament.

Teams 

15 teams, 8 from Estonia and 7 from Latvia, are contesting the league in the 2019–20 season.

Venues and locations

Regular season

League table

Results

Estonian championship
The national play-off was cancelled due to the COVID-19 pandemic. The ranking (no champion, no medallists) was set:
 Kalev/Cramo
 Avis Utilitas Rapla
 Pärnu Sadam
 Tartu Ülikool
 Rakvere Tarvas
 Tallinna Kalev/TLÜ
 TalTech
DQ Valga-Valka/Maks & Moorits

Latvian championship
The national play-off was cancelled due to the COVID-19 pandemic. The classification was made based on overall results in 2019–20 Latvian–Estonian Basketball League as of 13 March:

 VEF Rīga
 Ogre
 Ventspils
 SilJa1
 Valmiera Glass/ViA
 Latvijas Universitāte
 Liepāja
1 The club Jūrmala Betsafe changed its name to SilJa in mid-March.

References

External links
Official website
Estonian Basketball Association 
Latvian Basketball Association 

Latvia-Estonia
Latvian–Estonian Basketball League
2019–20 in Estonian basketball
2019–20 in Latvian basketball
Latvia-Estonia